Iturup, also historically known by other names, is an island  in the Kuril Archipelago separating the Sea of Okhotsk from the North Pacific Ocean. The town of Kurilsk, administrative center of Kurilsky District, is located roughly midway along its western shore. Iturup is the largest and northernmost of the southern Kurils, ownership of which is disputed by Japan and Russia. It is located between Kunashiri  to its southwest and Urup  to its northeast. The Vries Strait between Iturup and Urup forms the Miyabe Line dividing the predominant plants of the Kurils.

The native inhabitants of the islands since at least the 14th century were the Ainu. Various European explorers passed the area over the years but settlement varied between Russian and Japanese. The island was formally claimed as Japanese territory in 1855. Near the end of the Second World War in 1945, the Soviet Union occupied the southern Kurils and forceably removed its Japanese residents. Japan continues to claim the islands and considers the northern edge of the island to be its own northernmost point.

Names
The modern English name Iturup and earlier Yetorup are romanizations of the Russian name Ostrov Iturúp ("Iturup Island"). It was previously known in English as Etrof from the Japanese name Etorofu-tō ("Iturup Island"). Both the Russian and Japanese names come from the native Ainu Etuworop-sir, meaning "island with many capes".

Geography

Iturup consists of volcanic massifs and mountain ridges. A series of a dozen calc-alkaline volcanoes running NE to SW form the backbone of the island, the highest being Stokap (1,634 m) in the central part of Iturup. The shores of the island are high and abrupt. The vegetation mostly consists of spruce, larch, pine, fir, and mixed deciduous forests with alder, lianas and Kuril bamboo underbrush. The mountains are covered with birch and Siberian Dwarf Pine scrub, herbaceous flowers (including Fragaria iturupensis, the Iturup strawberry) or bare rocks.

The island also contains some high waterfalls, such as the Ilya Muromets.

Rheniite, a rhenium sulfide mineral (ReS2), was discovered in active hot fumaroles on Kudriavy volcano and first described in 2004. In the field it was originally mistaken for molybdenite.

History

Prehistory

The native inhabitants of all the Kuril islands are the Ainu. They have lived there since at least the 14th century.

Edo period

Europeans are first recorded visiting this part of the Kurils in 1643 when the  under Maarten Gerritsz Vries was exploring Hokkaido and the surrounding area for the Dutch East India Company (VOC). As with neighboring Urup, Iturup is sometimes said to have been the particular island intended in his account, but in fact his description of an enormous continental Company Land (named after the VOC) and a large and prosperous Staten Island (named after the States General) bear no relation to anything in the area, a fact established by Vitus Bering's lieutenant Martin Spanberg in a series of voyages in 1738, 1739, and 1742. The phantom Staten Island still continued to appear on European maps for decades afterward, however, and is now sometimes specifically conflated with Iturup despite its placement on most maps more closely matching Kunashiri.

The Japanese are first recorded reaching Iturup in 1661, when Shichirobei and his company drifted there by accident. Following Bering and Spanberg's voyages under the Russian flag, a settlement was established in the late 18th century, prompting the Japanese to establish a garrison around 1800 at the site of present-day Kurilsk. Japanese rule over Iturup was formally recognized in the 1855 Treaty of Shimoda.

Showa period

On 26 November 1941, a Japanese carrier fleet left Hitokappu Bay (now called Kasatka Bay), on the eastern shore of Iturup, and sailed for an attack on the American base of Pearl Harbor.

Shana Village was located on Iturup (Etorofu) in the Showa era, before 1945. It was the administrative capital of the Kuril islands. There was a village hospital, an Etorofu Fisheries factory, a radio tower of the post office with a radio receiving antenna. The receiver was battery-powered.

Post-World War II
In 1945, according to decisions of the Yalta Conference, it was occupied by the Soviet Union after Japan's defeat in World War II. The Japanese inhabitants were expelled to mainland Japan. In 1956 the two countries agreed to restore diplomatic relations, but a peace treaty, has not been concluded due to the disputed status of Iturup and some other nearby islands.

A Soviet Anti-Air Defense (PVO) airfield, Burevestnik (English: storm-petrel), is located on the island and was until 1993 home for a number of Mikoyan-Gurevich MiG-23 fighter jets. In 1968, Seaboard World Airlines Flight 253A was intercepted over the Kurils and forced to land at Burevestnik with 214 American troops bound for Vietnam. An older airfield, Vetrovoe, exists on the eastern part of the island and may have been used primarily by Japanese forces during World War II.

Contemporary period
It was the first airport built from scratch in Russia's post-Soviet history. It also has a military use. The Burevestnik military airfield  to the south, in the past received civilian aircraft as well, but was often closed because of fog. Burevestnik is now a reserve airfield for the new airport. On February 2, 2018, PBS NewsHour reported that Russia announced it is sending fighter planes to Iturup. Su-35 aircraft landed on a reserve airfield on the island in March 2018 and Su-35s were then deployed to Iturup airport on a trial basis in August 2018.

Administratively the island belongs to the Sakhalin Oblast of the Russian Federation. Japan claims Iturup as part of Nemuro Subprefecture.

Gallery

See also
Kuril Islands dispute

References

External links

Google Maps

Sakhalin Oblast

 
Islands of the Kuril Islands
Southern Kuriles
Islands of the Sea of Okhotsk
Islands of the Russian Far East
Islands of Hokkaido
Disputed islands
Japan–Soviet Union relations